is a professional Japanese baseball player. He plays infielder for the Saitama Seibu Lions.

References 

1997 births
Living people
Baseball people from Fukui Prefecture
Japanese baseball players
Nippon Professional Baseball infielders
Hokkaido Nippon-Ham Fighters players
Saitama Seibu Lions players